Possum Paddock is a 1921 Australian film based on a popular play by Kate Howarde. It was the first Australian movie to be directed by a woman. Only portions of it survive today.

Plot
Andrew "Dad" McQuade (John Cosgrove), a tough farmer, faces ruin because of a bank loan he cannot repay. He decides to sell a fifty-acre field called 'Possum Paddock' to his greedy neighbour, Dan Martin (James Martin). However, Hugh Bracken (Jack Kirby), who is dating McQuade's daughter, Nancy (Leslie Adrien), sells his car to pay off the old man's debts. He then discovers that a railway is to go through the paddock and is worth a fortune.

Original Play
The play premiered in Sydney in 1919 and was a massive hit, touring for the next ten months. It starred John Cosgrove and Howarde herself, along with Fred MacDonald.

The play was revived a number of times over the years.

Production
Howarde made the film in collaboration with actor Charles Villers. The adaptation turned the story into a more serious melodrama rather than a broad comedy.

It was shot at the Rushcutter's Bay studio established by Charles Cozens Spencer. Many of the cast had appeared in the original stage production, including Howarde and her daughter Leslie Adrien, who played the female lead.

New South Wales censors insisted a subplot about an unmarried mother be cut, in particular a scene where she imagines throwing her baby into a river.

Reception
Although the film appears to have been commercially successful, Howarde made no further films, preferring to concentrate on her theatre career.

Cast
John Cosgrove as Andrew McQuade
James Martin as Dan Martin
Leslie Adrien as Nancy McQuade
Jack Kirby as Hugh Bracken
Kate Howarde

References

External links

Possum Paddock at National Film and Sound Archive
Copy of original play at National Archives of Australia

1921 films
Australian silent feature films
Australian black-and-white films